Balintang Islands are a small group of rocky islands in the middle of Balintang Channel, in Luzon Strait, northern Philippines. Taiwan will be also directly to the north of Luzon Island in the Philippines via Luzon Strait to Bashi Channel.

Islands
In bad weather, the sea breaks heavily against them.

See also
List of islands of the Philippines

Notes and references
Notes

References

External links
 Map including the Balintang Islands

Islands of Cagayan